Lipstick is a Hindi language Indian television series, produced by Rose Movies that premiered on Zee TV on 9 September 2002.  The story unveils how best friends can turn into enemies in the pursuit of love and success.

Plot
The story revolves around the lives of two women, Sheetal and Suniti, set in the backdrop of a corporate war between two publishing houses. The story opens with cut-throat competition between two publishing houses - UPC and Hands. Their film magazines 'Darpan' and 'Lipstick' are run by Sheetal and Suniti, respectively. While Suniti believes in giving only true stories to her readers, Sheetal fabricates and sensationalizes stories to give positive publicity to film stars and earn their favour.

Cast
 Shweta Salve Suniti Verma (After Face Surgery) Gautami Kapoor as Tulsi  Gayatri (Before Plastic Surgery)
 Nigaar Khan as Sheetal Singhania 
 Krutika Desai Khan as Roopali Roopchand 
 Alyy Khan as Abhay Ahuja 
 Dimple Inamdar as Suman 
 Vaquar Shaikh as Suman's Husband 
 Sagar Arya / Rakesh Thareja / Vishal Singh as Tarun Singhania 
 Sadiya Siddiqui as Meera Ahuja
 Grusha Kapoor as Jasmine Khurana
 Shweta Gulati as Tara
 Anita Wahi as Rohini Singhania
 Faraaz Khan as Abhay Ahuja
 Shishir Sharma as Jagan Luthra
 Rajeev Verma as Vijay Singhania
 Zahida Parveen as Vaishali
 Aparna Tarakad as Minnie
 Usha Bachani as Shabnam Sikander
 Bobby Khanna as Deepak
 Manish Khanna as Dinesh Chopra
 Rishi Khurana as Bablu
 Kavita Rathod as Kanchan Kumari
 Bhisham Mansukhani as Vishal Khanna
 Smita Haya as Anita Chopra
 Mithilesh Chaturvedi as Vikrant Kumar Khanna
 Parineeta Borthakur as UPC's Employee
 Ananya Chatterjee as Nisha
 Amit Sareen as Jagdish
 Rasik Dave as Vivek
Anand Khanolkar as Ravi Bhatnagar
 Kanika Maheshwari

References

External links

Indian television soap operas
Zee TV original programming
2002 Indian television series debuts
2004 Indian television series endings
Rose Audio Visuals